Pér is a village in Győr-Moson-Sopron county, Hungary.

The settlement of the south-eastern part of the Bakony-Kisalföld reach the valley of the Győr Székesfehérvár with 81-number route, main Győr 15 km from the southeast can be found. This transition from the countryside to the plains and hills Sokorói (Pannonhalma Hills) is. The average altitude of 132 meters.

External links 
 Street map 

Populated places in Győr-Moson-Sopron County